Ismail Darbar is an Indian film score composer, instrumentalist, violinist and music director.

Career 
Ismail Darbar is from Surat, Gujarat. He worked for several years as a session violinist for leading music directors Laxmikant Pyarelal, Kalyanji Anandji, Bappi Lahiri, Rajesh Roshan, Anand–Milind, Nadeem-Shravan, Jatin–Lalit and A. R. Rahman. Finally, he got a break with Sanjay Leela Bhansali's film Hum Dil De Chuke Sanam. Earlier, Darbar had played violin for Jatin–Lalit in the movie Khamoshi: The Musical. Later, his music in Bhansali's Devdas was acclaimed. He did not work with Bhansali after Devdas due to personal differences. After Devdas, Darbar did a few more movies but without much success. In 2005, he composed for seven out of 12 tracks for Subhash Ghai's Kisna: The Warrior Poet after A. R. Rahman had left the project mid-way to complete an international assignment. However, Ghai would later say, "The music [of the film] has turned out so well that you can't distinguish an Ismail song from a Rahman one".

Darbar, Jatin–Lalit, Aadesh Shrivastava and Himesh Reshammiya were the four judges on Sa Re Ga Ma Pa Challenge 2005. Darbar was also a judge for Sa Re Ga Ma Pa Challenge 2007. He was also one of the three judges for Amul Star Voice of India 2 and Bharat Ki Shaan: Singing Star – Season 2 on DD National.

In 2007, Darbar released his first private music album, Rasiya Saajan, directed by S Ramachandran.

Darbar also appeared on season three of the reality series Bigg Boss which aired on Colors TV.

In 2018, Darbar co-composed his directorial debut film, Yeh Kaisa Tigdam, with Badshah (Nanu) Khan.

He entered state-level politics by joining BJP Gujarat in 2011.

Awards 
 R.D Burman awards in 1999
 National award for the music of Hum Dil De Chuke Sanam in 1999
Worlds Amazing Talent in 2021

Filmography

As music director

Controversies 
Darbar became the subject of controversy when he accused A.R. Rahman of having bought the Academy Awards he won for the film Slumdog Millionaire (2008). Rahman denied the allegations, but decided not to file a lawsuit against Darbar.

On 2 February 2015, Darbar, his son Zaid and their associates were arrested for physically assaulting an assistant director, Prashamit Chaudhury, who had been employed by him earlier. Darbar refused to pay his due salaries and instead settled the score by assaulting his former employee.

See also 
 List of Indian film music directors

References

External links 
 

Living people
Best Music Direction National Film Award winners
People from Surat
Hindi film score composers
Bigg Boss (Hindi TV series) contestants
Indian male film score composers
1964 births